Fowler is a locality on the west side of the lower Stikine River in northwestern British Columbia, Canada, located in the vicinity of the Great Glacier and Choquette Hot Springs Provincial Park.  Fowler Creek lies opposite it across the Stikine.

See also
Stikine, British Columbia
Glenora, British Columbia
Fowler (disambiguation)

References

Stikine Country
Unincorporated settlements in British Columbia